Het Huis Anubis (English: The House of Anubis) is a Dutch-Belgian children's television mystery drama based on elements of Egyptian mythology devised/created by Anjali Taneja, produced by Studio 100 and aired on Nickelodeon in the Netherlands and Flanders. It first aired in September 2006 and the last episode was broadcast on December 4, 2009. 

The show was a large commercial and critical success in the Benelux and obtained a cult status in the Dutch-language television world. The series was dubbed and released throughout Scandinavia as well. In the Netherlands, the series quickly attracted around half a million viewers per episode. In Flanders, the series was watched by over 300.000 viewers at its peak. The series was nominated for a Rose d'Or and won numerous local television award, including the Gouden Stuiver, the most prestigious Dutch children's television prize of its time. The series finale attracted 477.000 viewers in the Netherlands, easily becoming Nickelodeon's most-watched programme in 2009.

The European success of the series made the American branch of Nickelodeon interested in producing their own remake, which eventually became House of Anubis, which was broadcast between 2011 and 2013. The American Nickelodeon producers stated to Studio 100 that they had no interest in broadcasting the original version.

Premise
In Huis Anubis, a building dating from 1900 serving as an internaat, eight young people live together under the supervision of the strict manager Victor and sweet housekeeper Trudie. When newcomer Nienke Martens moves into the house, another resident, Joyce, suddenly disappears. Joyce's best friend Patricia does not trust Nienke and links her to the strange disappearance. Hoping to get Nienke expulsed out of the house, Patricia challenges Nienke to spend a night in the attic, which is forbidden terrain for the residents.

There, Nienke later makes a bizarre discovery: the recorded diary of Sarah Winsbrugge-Hennengouwen, a young girl who previously lived in the house. She discovers that Sarah's parents were archaeologists in Egypt and the original owners of Huis Anubis, who later mysteriously died in a tragic car crash after an expedition into the tomb of a pharaoh. It is revealed that the house has a secret history in relation to the expedition of the Winsbrugge-Hennengouwen pair to Egypt. Nienke decides to investigate, together with fellow resident Fabian, a nerd interested in the history of Ancient Egypt, and her roommate, Amber. Meanwhile, Patricia searches for answers about Joyce's disappearance.

While each resident has their own way of dealing with school, friends, love and growing up, some of the residents bond together to solve the mystery hidden within Huis Anubis.

Cast

Main

¹  Character was seen during the entire series. 

² Character left the show before it ended. 

³ Character appeared later.

Supporting

¹  The characters of Rufus Malpied and Zeno Terpstra would later be merged into one character (Rufus Zeno) for the English remake.

Episodes

Spin-offs
After its finale, the show was followed by a spin-off, called Het Huis Anubis en de Vijf van het Magische Zwaard (The House of Anubis and the Five of the Magical Sword). This series followed another group of friends, who moved into the house from the original series after the original residents moved out and went to college. None of the actors from the original returned. The spin-off was based on Celtic mythology as opposed to Egyptian mythology.

The series started re-airing all episodes in fall 2011, after the spin-off had its finale. Even though the majority of the episodes stayed the same, the episodes were aired in widescreen (the first two seasons were originally broadcast in fullscreen) and some of the old music was replaced with newer songs. Also, other small changes and cuts were made to make the seasons look a little bit more like the later seasons (which had higher budgets).

On 6 January 2018, Spike and MTV Netherlands aired a reunion special called: #TB Het Huis Anubis in which certain cast members looked back on their time on the show. The day after, Nickelodeon started re-airing all the episodes again, starting with season 1. Just like in 2011 the first season is being aired in widescreen and some of the music has been replaced. The old opening credits were also replaced with newer visuals. The logo for the show was also slightly modified.

International

Remakes
 The series was remade for Germany. The German remake, called Das Haus Anubis, debuted in September 2009 on Nick. It is filmed on exactly the same sets they used for the Dutch version and even used some of the same costumes. This version was almost identical to the original, except for the character names. However, they did make some changes to the storyline for season 2. The series was finished after the third season.
 In January 2011, an English language remake, called House of Anubis (recorded in Liverpool) debuted on Nickelodeon in the US. It used an all new set (and house) but kept almost all original character names (except Nienke, which became Nina; Appie, which became Alfie; Jeroen, which was changed to Jerome; and Joyce, which became Joy). The script was a rewritten version of the original script. This version also had a Spanish dub for Nickelodeon Latin America called El Misterio de Anubis. The second season premiered on January 9, 2012 and the second season's last episode was on March 9, 2012. The third season started airing on January 3, 2013, and ended on April 11th, 2013.

Dubs
 in Swedish as Huset Anubis on Nickelodeon (Sweden)
 in Danish as Huset Anubis on Nickelodeon (Denmark)
 in Spanish as La Casa de Anubis on Canal Once (Mexico)

Other countries have dubbed the English adaptation of the series House of Anubis instead of Het Huis Anubis.

Movies
There have been three movies, each with a stand-alone story, but with the same actors: 
 Het Pad der 7 Zonden (The Path of the 7 Sins), is the first Anubis movie, released in theaters in December 2008.
 De Wraak van Arghus (The Revenge of Arghus), is the second Anubis movie, released in theaters in December 2009.
 De Terugkeer van Sibuna (The Return of Sibuna), is the third and last Anubis movie and debuted on Nickelodeon in October 2010. The movie aired almost one year after the series ended. It showed where the characters went after they moved out of the house and what they are doing. Despite airing only one year after the last episode, the third movie takes place three years after the series finale, roughly around the same time the spin-off takes place. Some characters from that series also make (non-speaking) cameo appearances.

Books
The story of the series:

The story of the movies:

Additional books:

References

External links
 Official website (Dutch) The original page is updated in November 2011, it is now a sub site after the finale of the series

2000s Dutch television series
2006 Dutch television series debuts
2009 Dutch television series endings
Dutch children's television series
Dutch-language television shows
Television series based on Egyptian mythology